Menangle may refer to:
 Menangle virus
 Menangle, New South Wales